Alfredo Carbonell Debali was a Uruguayan lawyer and diplomat.

In the decade of 1930 he was chargé d'affaires at the Uruguayan embassy in Bern. In July 1938 he took part at the Évian Conference.

Later, in 1947, he was appointed Ambassador to the Holy See.

References

Uruguayan people of Catalan descent
Uruguayan people of Hungarian descent
20th-century Uruguayan lawyers
Uruguayan diplomats
Ambassadors of Uruguay to the Holy See